Richard 'Dick' Edward Barringer (born November 21, 1937) is an American politician and writer from Maine. Barringer served as Director of Public Lands in Maine from 1973 to 1975, when he was appointed Conservation Commissioner. In 1994, Barringer ran for Governor of Maine as a Democrat, finishing in third place in the primary. He is the author of  The Maine Manifest and Changes.

Barringer was born on November 21, 1937, and grew up in the Charlestown neighborhood of Boston, Massachusetts. He attended Harvard University. He enlisted in the United States Coast Guard and was on both active and reserve duty from 1959 to 1967 mostly serving in Latin America. He earned a Ph.D. in political science and economics from the Massachusetts Institute of Technology and subsequently taught at Harvard.

References

1937 births
Living people
People from Charlestown, Boston
Maine Democrats
United States Coast Guard enlisted
United States Coast Guard reservists
Harvard University alumni
MIT School of Humanities, Arts, and Social Sciences alumni
American environmentalists
State cabinet secretaries of Maine
Harvard University faculty